The 1984 Harvard Crimson football team was an American football team that represented Harvard University during the 1984 NCAA Division I-AA football season. The Crimson tied for second in the Ivy League.

In their 12th year under head coach Joe Restic, the Crimson compiled a 5–4 record but were outscored 196 to 182 by opponents. Steven W. Abbott was the team captain.

Harvard's 5–2 conference record tied for second place in the Ivy League standings. The Crimson outscored Ivy opponents 155 to 139. 

Harvard played its home games at Harvard Stadium in the Allston neighborhood of Boston, Massachusetts.

Schedule

References

Harvard
Harvard Crimson football seasons
Harvard Crimson football
Harvard Crimson football